The National Hockey Association of Afghanistan is the governing body of field hockey in Afghanistan. It is affiliated with the Fédération Internationale de Hockey (FIH) and the Asian Hockey Federation (ASHF). The headquarters of the association is in Kabul, Afghanistan.

Abdul Matin Qodosi is the president of the association. Dr. Mirwais Bahawi is the secretary.

History

See also
Asian Hockey Federation

References

External links
Afghanistan-FIH
NHL Officials Association from Afghanistan

Afghanistan
Hockey
Field hockey in Afghanistan